In mathematical finite group theory, a p-group of symplectic type is a p-group such that all characteristic abelian subgroups are cyclic.

The width n of a group G of symplectic type is the largest integer n such that the group contains an extraspecial subgroup H of order p1+2n such that G = H.CG(H), or 0 if G contains no such subgroup.

Groups of symplectic type appear in centralizers of involutions of groups of GF(2)-type.

References

Finite groups